The Syrian camel (Camelus moreli), is an extinct species of camel from Syria. It has been discovered in the Hummal area of the western Syrian desert. The first of the fossils were discovered late in 2005, and several more were discovered about a year later. The camelid was found together with Middle Paleolithic human remains.

See also
Megacamelus
Titanotylopus
Megatylopus

References

External links 
 

Mammals of the Middle East
Nomina nuda
Pleistocene extinctions
Prehistoric camelids